Tracy Burr Strong (6 October 194311 May 2022) was a philosopher and political theorist. His first book, Friedrich Nietzsche and the Politics of Transfiguration (1974) was recognised as a valuable contribution to scholarship on the German philosopher Friedrich Nietzsche. It repositioned Nietzsche's project as political against the assumption that Nietzsche's philosophy  was apolitical.

Life and career 
Strong was born in Weixian, China, while his parents were being held within a Japanese prisoner-of-war camp. A Swedish vessel, the Gripsholm, took Strong as a baby to New York for repatriation, arriving on 18 December 1943. He was educated at Collège de Genève and at Oberlin College (where he was on the fencing team and majored in government), earning a BA in 1963. He received a PhD from Harvard University in 1968. He was Henry Kissinger's teaching assistant, and was president of the Harvard chapter of Students for a Democratic Society. 

As a professor at Harvard University he taught political theory, a topic he continued to pursue at the University of Pittsburgh and at the University of California at San Diego, where he served as Associate Chancellor (as well as department chair) until his retirement. He also taught at Barcelona University and the University of Lyon. He was also appointed to an international research project in ethnography at Heidelberg University. Until his death, he was lecturing and mentoring students at the University of Southampton, where he was only a few weeks away from his second retirement.

Philosophical and other academic work 
Considered an "eminent interpreter of Rousseau and Nietzsche", Strong published on political theory and philosophy with additional interests in the history of ideas, aesthetics in the contexts of film and traditional art forms. He published journal papers and books on Hobbes, Rousseau, and Nietzsche in particular. He also wrote about the work of his contemporaries such as Carl Schmitt. His first book, Friedrich Nietzsche and the Politics of Transfiguration, published in 1974, was considered a watershed moment in both political philosophy and Nietzsche studies. His later text, Politics Without Vision: Thinking without a Banister in the Twentieth Century won the David Easton Prize in 2013.   From 1990 to 2000 he served as editor of the journal Political Theory and co-authored a biography of his great-aunt, the author and journalist Anna Louise Strong. In his latter years he embarked on studies of the role of good, evil, and love in Nietzsche's work. Additionally, he corresponded with Stanley Cavell whom he first met at Harvard. He had an abiding interest in Richard Wagner, Beethoven, and music in general, Samuel Beckett and Mark Twain, Abraham Lincoln, Waldo Emerson, Hawthorne, and Shakespeare.

Selected writings

Authored volumes 
Friedrich Nietzsche and the Politics of Transfiguration, Champaign, Illinois: University of Illinois Press, 1975. Expanded edition, 1999.
Right in Her Soul: The Life of Anna Louise Strong (with Helene Keyssar), New York: Random House, 1983.
Politics Without Vision: Thinking Without a Banister in the Twentieth Century, Chicago, IL: University of Chicago Press, 2012.
Learning One’s Native Tongue: Citizenship, Contestation, and Conflict in America, Chicago, IL: University of Chicago Press, 2019.

References

External links

 Tracy Strong's faculty page at Southampton University
 Tracy Strong's emeritus faculty page at UC San Diego

1943 births
2022 deaths
20th-century American philosophers
21st-century American philosophers

Oberlin College alumni
Harvard University alumni
University of Pittsburgh faculty
University of California, San Diego faculty